Kalevan Pallo Naiset or KalPa Naiset are an ice hockey team in the Naisten Liiga (NSML), the premier women's ice hockey league in Finland. Founded in 1990, they play in Kuopio, the largest city in the eastern-central province of North Savo, at the Kuopion jäähalli (Niirala), and also use Lippumäen jäähalli as a secondary venue. The team has won one Finnish Championship silver medal, in 2021, and four bronze medals, in 1995, 1996, 2017, and 2023.

History 
In 2020, the team qualified for the Aurora Borealis Cup playoff final and were set to face the reigning champions, Kiekko-Espoo, when the playoffs were canceled due to the COVID-19 pandemic before the first game of the finals. By making it to the playoff finals, KalPa was guaranteed at least a silver medal, which would have been the highest finish in team history to that point, but with the cancellation of the season no Finnish Championship (SM) medals were awarded.

Season-by-season results 
This is a partial list of the most recent seasons completed by KalPa Naiset. Note: Finish = Rank at end of regular season; GP = Games played, W = Wins (3 points), OTW = Overtime wins (2 points), OTL = Overtime losses (1 point), L = Losses, GF = Goals for, GA = Goals against, Pts = Points, Top scorer: Points (Goals+Assists)

Players and personnel

2022–23 roster 

Coaching staff and team personnel 
 Head coach: Mika Väärälä
 Assistant coach: Pekka Romppanen
 Conditioning coach: Tarja Koski
 Team managers: Taina Lappi & Maarit Paroinen
 Equipment managers: Jari Hämäläinen, Irina Ivanoff, & Harri Mäkkeli

Team captains 
 Johanna Juutilainen, 2010–11
 Isa Rahunen, 2011–12
 Marjo Voutilainen, 2012–13
 Venla Hovi & Anni Kettunen, 2013–14
 Johanna Juutilainen, 2015–2018
 Tanja Niskanen, 2018–19
 Tiina Ranne & Emma Ritari, 2019–20
 Emma Ritari, 2020–21
 Johanna Juutilainen, 2021–

Head coaches 
 Mikko Miettinen, –2000
 Seppo Tirronen, 2000–
 Marjo Voutilainen, 2016–2022
 Mika Väärälä, 2022–

Awards and honours

Finnish Championship 
  Aurora Borealis Cup Runners-up (1): 2021
  Third Place (4) : 1995, 1996, 2017, 2023
Sources:

Player awards 

 Riikka Nieminen Award (Player of the Year)
 2020–21: Elisa Holopainen
 2019–20: Tanja Niskanen
 2018–19: Elisa Holopainen
 Katja Riipi Award (Best forward)
 2020–21: Elisa Holopainen
 2019–20: Elisa Holopainen
 2018–19: Elisa Holopainen
 Marianne Ihalainen Award (Top point scorer)
 2018–19: Elisa Holopainen
 Tiia Reima Award (Top goal scorer)
 2022–23: Elisa Holopainen
 2020–21: Matilda Nilsson
 2019–20: Elisa Holopainen
 2018–19: Elisa Holopainen
 Sari Fisk Award (Best plus/minus)
 2019–20: Matilda Nilsson
 Emma Laaksonen Award (Fair-play player)
 2020–21: Johanna Juutilainen
 2016–17: Tanja Niskanen
 Hannu Saintula Award (Coach of the Year)
 2019–20: Marjo Voutilainen

Player of the Month 

 November 2022: Elisa Holopainen
 September 2020: Elisa Holopainen
 September 2019: Matilda Nilsson

All-Stars 
First Team

 2020–21: Elisa Holopainen (W), Matilda Nilsson (W)
 2019–20: Elisa Holopainen (W), Tanja Niskanen (C), Matilda Nilsson (W)
 2018–19: Tanja Niskanen (C), Elisa Holopainen (W)
 2014–15: Matilda Nilsson (W)
 2013–14: Venla Hovi (W)

Second Team

 2020–21: Tiina Ranne (G)
 2019–20: Tiina Ranne (G)
 2018–19: Matilda Nilsson (W)
 2017–18: Matilda Nilsson (W), Elisa Holopainen (W)
 2016–17: Matilda Nilsson (W), Tanja Niskanen (C)

Team records

Single-season records
 Most goals in a season: Elisa Holopainen, 39 goals (25 games; 2020–21) / Matilda Nilsson, 39 goals (30 games; 2018–19)
 Most assists in a season: Tanja Niskanen, 48 assists (29 games; 2018–19)
 Most points in a season: Tanja Niskanen, 79 points (29 games; 2018–19)
 Most points in a season, defenceman: Kirsi Hänninen, 30 points (23 games; 1995–96)
 Best points per game, over 10 games played: Marjo Voutilainen, 3.00 (14 games; 1997–98)

 Most penalty minutes in a season: Kirsi Hänninen, 66 PIM (23 games; 1995–96)
 Best save percentage in a season, over ten games played: Tiina Ranne, .942 SVS% (18 games; 2019–20)
 Best goals against average in a season, over ten games played: Tiina Ranne, 1.86 GAA (14 games; 2020–21)

Career records 
 Most career goals: Tanja Niskanen, 257 goals (301 games; 2006–2022)
 Most career assists: Tanja Niskanen, 231 assists (301 games; 2006–2022)
 Most career points: Tanja Niskanen, 488 points (301 games; 2006–2022)
 Best career points per game, over 30 games played: Elisa Holopainen, 1.91 points per game (129 games; 2016–2021)
 Most career points, defenceman: Emma Ritari, 102 points (251 games; 2009–2021)
 Most career penalty minutes: Salla Rantanen, 306 PIM (236 games; 2012–2022)
 Most games played, skater: Tanja Niskanen, 301 games (2006–2022)
 Most games played, goaltender: Jenna Juutilainen, 115 games (2009–2022)

All-time scoring leaders
The top regular season point scorers in KalPa Naiset history.

Note: Nat = Nationality; Pos = Position; GP = Games played; G = Goals; A = Assists; Pts = Points; P/G = Points per game;  = 2022–23 KalPa player

Source(s): Elite Prospects

Notable alumni 

Years active with KalPa listed alongside players' names.
 Venla Hovi, 2012–2014
 Kirsi Hänninen, 1995–96
 Kati Kovalainen, 1993–1996
 Rose Matilainen, 1993–1996
 Terhi Mertanen, 1999–2001
 Matilda Nilsson, 2014–2021
 Oona Parviainen, 1993–1999
 Tuula Puputti, 1992–1995
 Isa Rahunen, 2006–2013
 Saila Saari, 2020–21
 Riikka Sallinen, 1995–96
 Eve Savander, 2013–14
 Marjo Voutilainen, 1995–2001 & 2010–2014

International player(s)
  Nozomi Kiribuchi, 2015–16

References

External links 
 Team information and statistics from Eliteprospects.com and Eurohockey.com and Hockeyarchives.info (in French)
 
 

Naisten Liiga (ice hockey) teams
Kuopio
1990 establishments in Finland
KalPa